Mladen Mitić, known by his nickname Munja, is a Bosnian guitarist. He first found mainstream success as an original lineup member of a Bosnian garage rock band Zabranjeno Pušenje.

Career 
Mitić joined a Sarajevo-based garage rock band Zabranjeno Pušenje in fall 1980. He performed on the band's first two studio albums: Das ist Walter (1984) and Dok čekaš sabah sa šejtanom (1985). In 1986, he left the band with some other members.

Mitić has been living in Los Angeles, CA since the 1990s.

Discography 

Zabranjeno pušenje
 Das ist Walter (1984)
 Dok čekaš sabah sa šejtanom (1985)

References

External links
 Discography on Discogs

Year of birth missing (living people)
Living people
Bosnia and Herzegovina expatriates in the United States
Bosnia and Herzegovina guitarists
Bosnia and Herzegovina male guitarists
Bosnia and Herzegovina rock musicians
Musicians from Sarajevo
Zabranjeno pušenje members
Yugoslav musicians